Anna Džurňáková (born 24 January 1983 in Kežmarok, Czechoslovakia) is a Slovakian ice hockey forward.

International career
Džurňáková was selected for the Slovakia national women's ice hockey team in the 2010 Winter Olympics. She played in all five games, scoring one goal. She played in all three games of the 2010 Olympic qualifying campaign.

Džurňáková has also appeared for Slovakia at seven IIHF Women's World Championships, across three levels. Her first appearance came in 2005. She appeared at the top level championships in 2011 and 2012.

Career statistics

International career

References

External links
Eurohockey.com Profile
Sports-Reference Profile

1983 births
Living people
Ice hockey players at the 2010 Winter Olympics
Olympic ice hockey players of Slovakia
People from Kežmarok
Sportspeople from the Prešov Region
Slovak women's ice hockey forwards
Universiade medalists in ice hockey
Universiade bronze medalists for Slovakia
Competitors at the 2011 Winter Universiade